Admiral Meyer may refer to:

Hans Karl Meyer (1898–1989), German Kriegsmarine flotilla admiral
Wayne E. Meyer (1926–2009), U.S. Navy rear admiral

See also
Alfred Meyer-Waldeck (1864–1928), Imperial German Navy vice admiral